Cardiff West services is a motorway service station on junction 33 of the M4 motorway and the Capel Llanilltern junction of the A4232 near Cardiff, Wales. It is owned by Moto. In 2008, the services won the AA Patrol Approved Awards for best toilet.

The services has previously acted as a site for escorting fans to Cardiff City FC games, because of travelling restrictions imposed on away fans visiting the city. These restrictions were relaxed in 2010, but the services continued to act as a sales point for match vouchers. Subsequently, the services has become well known to Cardiff City fans, particularly after a prominent appearance in the situation comedy Gavin & Stacey.

In 2004, the services was the site of several protests over the rise in fuel duty. In May, 50 heavy goods vehicles (HGVs) entered the services' car park as the ending point of a "go slow" demonstration along the M4. In June, the site was chosen as a meeting place for another protest. 150 HGVs made a journey from the services to the centre of Cardiff.

In 2010, rugby player Andy Powell was arrested at the services for allegedly driving a stolen golf buggy while intoxicated.

References

External links 

Motorway Services Online - Cardiff West
Motorway Services Info - Cardiff West

M4 motorway service stations
Moto motorway service stations
Motorways in Wales
Transport in Cardiff